is a commuter railway station on the Enoshima Electric Railway (Enoden) located in the city of Fujisawa, Kanagawa Prefecture, Japan.

Lines
Yanagikōji Station is served by the Enoshima Electric Railway Main Line and is 1.2 kilometers from the terminus of the line at Fujisawa Station.

Station layout
Then station consists of a single side platform serving one track for bi-directional traffic. There is no station building and the station is unattended.

Platforms

History 
Yanagikōji Station was opened on 1 April 1920. It was closed on 30 June 1944 during World War II and reopened on 15 July 1950.

Station numbering was introduced to the Enoshima Electric Railway January 2014 with Yanagikōji being assigned station numbers EN03.

Passenger statistics
In fiscal 2019, the station was used by an average of 2,714 passengers daily, making it 10th used of the 15 Enoden stations 

The passenger figures for previous years are as shown below.

Surrounding area
Kugenuma High School

See also
 List of railway stations in Japan

References

External links

Enoden station information 

Railway stations in Kanagawa Prefecture
Railway stations in Japan opened in 1920
Railway stations in Fujisawa, Kanagawa